The  (ANFI; Italian National Feline Association) is the Italian official registry association for catteries and cat breeding. It was formed in 1934 and is currently recognized by the Italian Ministerial decree dated 9 June 2005.  Every year it organizes cat shows all over the country. 

History 
The origin of the association dates back to 1934 when a group of enthusiasts began to organize the first cat shows in the cities of Turin, Milan, and Florence. These cat shows, being a novelty in Italy, aroused a great interest and continued until the beginning of the Second World War. The activities of the association resumed from 1946 when the Società Felina Italiana (Italian Feline Society) was founded. Later the name was changed to Federazione Felina Italiana (Italian Feline Federation) and, finally, Associazione Nazionale Felina Italiana (Italian National Feline Association). 

In 1949 the association sent a delegation to Paris which, together with the Fédération Féline Française (Franch Feline Federation) and the Royal Cat Society of Flander, contributed to the establishment of the Fédération Internationale Féline.

In June 1994 in Venice, ANFI organized the first world congress of feline associations with the patronage of the FIFe. The aim of this gathering was finding common rules for competition  and for the breed standards at world level. The event was attended by representatives of the main associations dedicated to cats, for the first time ever reunited at the same table, and led to the foundation of the World Cat Congress.

Purpose 
ANFI's aims include:

 operating the national register of pedigree cats;
 training judges and experts;
 creating and organising cat shows;
 promoting cat health.

References

External links

 (in Italian)

Clubs and societies in Italy
Cat registries
Organizations established in 1934
1934 establishments in Italy